Beignet (also  ,) is a type of fritter, or deep-fried pastry, usually made from yeast dough in France, possibly made from pâte à choux and called Pets-de-nonne, nun's fart, in France, but may also be made from other types of dough, including yeast dough. In France there are at least 20 different versions. They can vary in shape, the flour used for the dough, and the filling. They are popular in French, Italian, and French-American cuisines.

Types

The term beignet can be applied to two varieties, depending on the type of pastry. The French-style beignet in the United States has the specific meaning of deep-fried choux pastry. 

Beignets can also be made with yeast pastry, which might be called boules de Berlin in French, referring to Berliner doughnuts, which lack the typical doughnut hole, filled with fruit or jam.

In Corsica, beignets made with chestnut flour are known as fritelli.

In Canadian French, doughnuts are referred to alternately as beigne or beignet.

Louisiana

Louisiana-style beignets are square or rectangular fried pastries made from leavened dough rather than choux pastry. In New Orleans, they are best known as a breakfast served with powdered sugar on top. They are traditionally prepared to be eaten fresh and hot before consumption. Variations of fried dough can be found across cuisines internationally; however, the origin of the term beignet is specifically French. In the United States, beignets have been popular within New Orleans Creole cuisine and may also be served as a dessert. They were brought to New Orleans in the 18th century by French colonists, from "the old mother country", also brought by Acadians, and became a large part of home-style Creole cooking. Variations often include banana or plantain – popular fruits in the port city – or berries.

Preparation
Ingredients used to prepare beignets traditionally include:
 lukewarm water
 granulated sugar
 evaporated milk
 bread flour
 shortening
 oil or lard, for deep-frying
 confectioners' sugar

See also

 List of choux pastry dishes
 List of doughnut varieties

References

Further reading
 Yves Thuriès, French Pastry, 
 Rosana G. Moreira et al., Deep Fat Frying: Fundamentals and Applications,

External links 
 

American doughnuts
Choux pastry
Cuisine of New Orleans
French-American cuisine
French pastries
Louisiana Creole cuisine
American breakfast foods